Bytków  is a village in the administrative district of Gmina Rudna, within Lubin County, Lower Silesian Voivodeship, in south-western Poland. According to the 2011 National Census, it has a population of 30 inhabitants. It is the smallest village in the administrative district of Gmina Rudna.

References

Villages in Lubin County